Chinna Veedu (colloquial meaning: "Mistress") is a 1985 Indian Tamil-language film written and directed by K. Bhagyaraj. The film is the debut in Tamil for lead female Kalpana, who is also sister of actress Urvashi, who made her debut with K. Bhagyaraj in the 1983 film Mundhanai Mudichu.

Plot 
Madanagopal is a bachelor who dreams about his future wife as a dream girl who has to be beautiful from head to toe. But his parents arrange marriage with a girl, Bhagyalakshmi, without his consent. Gopal is shocked on seeing the photograph of his would-be wife as she is chubby, fat, unappealing, and not even nearer to his expectations of his dream girl according to him. On the day of marriage, he runs away from the marriage hall. Gopal's parents find him and convince him to marry her, as his sister has to get married to the brother of his bride on the same day.

Gopal gets very disappointed about his marriage. On the nuptial night, he yells at his wife about the forcible wedlock and how he cannot imagine her to be his wife who is no way suited to his personality. Bhagyalakshmi, though hurt deep in her heart by his body shaming, keeps quiet as an ideal wife. Both of them live in the same room, but do not consummate their wedding. Gopal feels that he made a sacrifice of his life by marrying a woman like Bhagyalakshmi, and so he does not respect his in-laws' family. She tolerates all of his stupid acts as she loves him very much and also has an inferiority complex about herself. Even after his marriage, Gopal does not stop dreaming about his dream girl and introduces himself as a bachelor to the women he meet. Chakravarthi, Bhagyalakshmi's  brother, visits his sister's home and finds out about Gopal and his cheap mentality. He tails Gopal everywhere and informs his whereabouts to his sister. Bhagyalakshmi gets angry on this and she yells at him to stay away from her husband. She tells Gopal to have a mistress for himself, to which Gopal pretends as if he is a sincere husband but he gets into dilemma on his wife's approval. Gopal's mother gets angry that her daughter has conceived, but Bhagyalakshmi shows no sign of pregnancy, and she pricks her a lot. Hence, Gopal seduces his wife, but reveals he did it for her sake as he feels pity for her. This pinches Bhagyalakshmi's self-respect and yells at him that she wants the love of her husband and not his pity.

Gopal is given a task of collecting the loan amount from a woman named Maragathambal and he goes in search of her. On the way he is stopped by a young woman who calls him to her home. She sells some vessels at her home and pays the loan installment. Gopal feels bad on that, and so he gets some time from the bank to repay the amount. The girl introduces herself as Banu, an unemployed woman and granddaughter of Maragathambal. Slowly a friendship develops between both of them, and he visits her home frequently. One day, Gopal becomes emotional while both are alone and seduces Banu. Banu forgives him for his act and asks him to marry her but gets shocked when she knows he is married. Gopal runs away from the place, feeling guilty of spoiling a homely girl's life. In reality, Banu is a prostitute who cunningly wants to trap Gopal by pretending like an innocent girl. Bhagyalakshmi becomes pregnant, and Gopal turns his attention towards her to take good care of her, because of which he reduces the frequency of his visits to Banu. Banu understands that he is slowly escaping from her and blackmails him that she is also pregnant and compels him to marry her. She ties the sacred knot by herself when police come to arrest on a brothel case. Gopal accepts to them that he married Banu.

Gopal's family discover his relationship with another woman and shouts at him. But Bhagyalakshmi keeps quiet and calm and is confident that her husband will come back to her. Meanwhile, Gopal finds out Banu's background and the woman who is not her grandmother, but her servant. He catches her red-handed and warns her that she should not interfere in his life any more, and dumps her. Banu complains to police that Gopal married her as his second wife when his first wife is alive, and Gopal is arrested. Bhagyalakshmi meets Banu and tells her to leave her husband, to which Banu does not accept initially and threatens that she will face the consequences in court. But Bhayalakshmi shows all evidences of her past legal cases where Banu trapped men for money like how she trapped Gopal and so her case will not succeed. Banu gets furious and sets revenge on pregnant Bhagyalakshmi after Bhagyalakshmi leaves her house. Gopal convinces the police about Banu and struggles to save his wife, but Bhagyalakshmi gets attacked by Banu's henchman when she tried to save her husband. She is admitted to the hospital, and after much serious treatment, delivers triplets. Gopal reunites with his wife and kids and live happily.

Cast 
 K. Bhagyaraj as Madanagopal
 Kalpana as Bhagyalakshmi
 Anu (Babitha) as Banu
 Uma Rani
 Jai Ganesh as Bhagyalakshmi's Father
 V. Gopalakrishnan as Doctor
 K. K. Soundar as Madanagopal's Father
 Kovai Sarala as Madanagopal's Mother
 Mayilsamy
 Chakri Toleti as Chakravarthy, Bhagyalakshmi's Younger Brother
 Kaja Shariff as Office Boy
 G. Hari Prasath

Production 
Kalpana, sister of actress Urvashi made her debut in Tamil cinema with this film. Kovai Sarala portrayed the role of Bhagyaraj's mother at a young age. It was the first film in Tamil language to introduce Vijayalakshmi as the  first woman cinematographer.

Soundtrack 
The music was composed by Ilaiyaraaja. The song "Chittu Kuruvi" is set in the Pushpalathika raga, and based on Antonín Dvořák's "Scherzo: Molto Vivace".

Reception 
Chinna Veedus initial release was postponed by a few years because it was found to have similarities with other films like Gopurangal Saivathillai, Rosappu Ravikkaikari and Kanni Paruvathile. Jayamanmadhan of Kalki wrote despite being an old plot, Bhagyaraj has done only few changes in presenting the plot but praised the performances of Bhagyaraj, Kalpana, Jai Ganesh and Vijayalakshmi's cinematography. The film ran for over 100 days in theatres.

References

External links 
 

1980s Tamil-language films
1985 films
Films about adultery in India
Films directed by K. Bhagyaraj
Films scored by Ilaiyaraaja
Tamil films remade in other languages